The Queen is a South African telenovela that premiered on Mzansi Magic on 1 August 2016 and on Canal Plus in April 2020. It is produced by Ferguson Films, owned by acting veterans Connie Ferguson and her late husband Shona Ferguson. The Queen ran at a 260 episode per season and aired every Monday to Friday at 21h00 on Mzansi Magic.

The Queen concluded season 4 with a one-hour finale on Friday 24 July 2020, season 5 premiered on Monday 27 July 2020. The Queen had a crossover episode with The River, featuring Sindi Dlathu as Lindiwe Dlamini -Dikana who is Harriet's friend.

On 8 October 2019, it is known that Vatiswa Ndara wrote a 6 page long letter to Nathi Mthethwa, the arts and culture minister, which was posted on Twitter. In the letter, she alleged that Connie Ferguson and Shona Ferguson's company, Ferguson Films, mistreated actors in the entertainment industry. The letter went viral and sparked debates on the internet. As a result of this letter Dineo Moeketsi and Rami Chuene agreed on this on social media. The two actresses were cut from the Soapie in its fourth season with Chuene's character being killed and Moeketsi's character being killed in the series's fifth season. The Fergusons denied that the two were fired however Moeketsi claims she was fired. In its fifth season Jessica Nkosi and 
Rapulana Seiphemo were cast starring opposite Connie Ferguson the two were the series's main antagonists up until the sixth season finale.

Longtime series star Loyiso MacDonald (who had been part of the cast since the show's inception) exited the show in June 2021. Zandile Msutwana suffered an injury on set and she was temporarily replaced by Thembisa Mdoda-Nxumalo while she recovered at home. At the end of the shows sixth season several cast members who were written out of the series including Jessica Nkosi who played lead villain Thando Sebata, Rapulana Seiphemo who played Hector Sebata, Zandile Msutwana who played Vuyiswa Jola since the shows inception, Thembsie Matu who played Patronella Zulu, Sibusiswe Jili who played Georgina Zulu, Brenda Ngxoli who played NomaPrincess. Three cast were demoted to be a recurring characters including Thembsie Matu who played Patronella Zulu, Vuyo Ngcukana who played Lumko "Shumacher" Toto, Sipho Manzini who played Jabulani "Mjekejeke" Zulu .Jessica Nkosi however was set to stay on the soapie until the series finale in January 2023 however she pulled out for personal reasons and her character as well as future storylines had to be canned and she been written off immediately her Antagonistic role was replaced by Standile Nkosi who played villain Londiwe Jama for the last season.

The channel cancelled the show in March 2022 when The Queen was renewed for a shortened seventh and final season, with only 125 episodes instead of the usual 260-episode season order. Season 7 will premiere in July 2022 and run until a series finale on 13 January 2023 following seven successful seasons. The telenovela is going to be replaced by a Xhosa's first and exclusive telenovela titled Gqeberha : The Empire which is produced by Tshedza Pictures.

The Queen series finale aired on 13 January 2023.

Episodes

Plot
The show revolves around the Khoza family, drug lords who hide their dealings behind their logistics company, and their conflicts with their competitors and the Tembisa Police Service. Harriet Khoza known as "The Queen" takes over the reins of the Khoza dynasty after her husband passes and does everything to protect herself as well as her family from Jerry Maake a police captain who believes Harriet killed his son and is determined to bring her and her criminal organisation down. As the series progresses Harriet Khoza then takes on Gracious Mabuza and her daughter Goodness Mabuza in their war against each other.
The Khoza's world is turned upside down by the arrival of a new lethal and ambitious enemy Thando Sebata (Jessica Nkosi) a powerful drug lord heiress, trained assassin and sniper who runs her families drug empire with an iron fist and takes the throne right from under Harriet and becomes the new drug queen-pin of Midrand
(Connie Ferguson) and (Themba Ndaba) are the only actors who appeared in the premiere and are scheduled to appear in the series finale.

Main characters

 Harriet Mathapelo – Khoza played by Connie Ferguson. She is the lead female character and main character alongside Brutus. She is the widow of Mzi Khoza and mother of Kea and Kagiso. She is also the matriarch of the Khoza family. She loves her children and will do anything to protect them. Harriet's parents, Kedibone and Tiro Mathapelo, came to visit her and the rest of family. Harriet had remained very bitter with her parents claiming they were fraudsters. During a family dinner, the main reason for Harriet's anger and bitterness; was that her father Tiro had raped her multiple times as a teenager. Since the truth about Tiro was revealed, no one in the family including Tiro's wife Kedibone, seemed to believe Harriet. Finally, Tiro finally confessed to the family what he did to Harriet when she was younger. Since Tiro's confession, he apologised and begged for Harriet's forgiveness but Harriet rejected Tiro one last time and fully disowned him. Tiro then committed suicide by jumping in front of a train when the whole family disowned him. She also had a brief affair with fellow drug dealer, Zack Phiri prior to the premiere of the show. Harriet and Brutus are the leaders of "The Big 5", which is a group consisting of the biggest drug dealers in Gauteng. She hired Mogapi, who was Jerry's son to kill her husband at Kea's wedding in the premiere episode. Harriet and Brutus control the biggest cocaine territory in South Africa. Hector and his sidekick Jaros sent out helicopters to shoot at the Khoza's at the golf course. Their main plan was to kill her and her loved one's. During the shootout between the shooters in the helicopter, police and the Khoza's along with Dollar, Harriet tried to run for cover and Jerry jumped on her body as a shield to save her. Harriet attempted suicide because she felt responsible for Kea's death. After her hospitalisation, she took the decision to leave the cocaine business. Harriet came back into the business and partnered up with Hector. In Season 6, Harriet and Hector were in a brief relationship which resulted in them getting married. Harriet, however, hired a hitman to kill Hector. She was in a drug war with Londiwe but later kills her in the finale. (Main role: Season 1 - 7)
 Captain Jeremiah "Jerry" Maake, played by Shona Ferguson. He was the tough, robocop husband of Vuyiswa Jola and he was the father of Amo, Mogapi and Bakang. Jerry and Vuyiswa have been trying to bring down the Khoza family but have failed. His siblings were Boi, Roy and Adelaide Maake. He was the Lieutenant Captain of Tembisa Police Station. Hector Sebata and his sidekick Jaros sent out helicopters to shoot at the Khoza's at the golf course. They're plan was to kill Harriet and her loved one's. During the shootout between the shooters in the helicopter, police and the Khoza's along with Dollar, Harriet tried to run for cover and Jerry jumped on her body as a shield to save her and he died. (Main role: Season 1 - 4)
 Keabetswe "Kea" Esmarelda Khoza, played by Dineo Langa. She was the beautiful, outspoken and only daughter of Harriet. Kea was married to Tumisho in season 1 but they later divorced. She had previously dated Jerry's sister's son Kwanele. She was also in a relationship with Tebogo but he became physically abusive towards Kea. He beat Kea up one final time, putting her in hospital. Once Harriet and the rest of the Khoza family found out, Tebogo was severely beaten himself by Harriet and was later shot and killed by the Khoza's. She was in a relationship with Eric. She started her own boutique as a front for the Khoza drug business. Kea eloped with her boyfriend Eric. Kea was killed in an explosion on her way to Jerry Maake's funeral. Kea was buried in season 5's tenth episode. (Main role: Season 1 - 4)
 Uncle Brutus Mfanafuthi Khoza, played by Themba Ndaba. He is the lead male character and main character alongside Harriet. He is the brother of Mzi, brother in-law of Harriet and patriarch of the Khoza family. It has been revealed that he has a lot of children with different women. He is the father of Bhekumuzi and Dingane and the uncle of Shaka, Kagiso and Kea. He was in a brief relationship with Dolly and was almost killed in season 2 by an explosion at Shaka's wedding. He and Harriet were the leaders of "The Big 5" and controlled the biggest cocaine territory in South Africa before leaving the business. He was in a romantic relationship with Noma. (Main role: Season 1 - 7)
 Kagiso "Muscle Man" Melusi Khoza, played by Loyiso MacDonald. He is the youngest child of Harriet Khoza and brother to Shaka and Kea. He was a pilot in the army. He had romantic relationships with Amo, Goodness, Kamina, Akhona and Siyanda. Kagiso killed Goodness' father Goldfinger in season 1. Kagiso saw Harriet at fault for Kea's death. Kagiso married Goodness Mabuza and they have a daughter named Mvelo. Kagiso and Goodness moved to Eastern Cape with their daughter to start a new life. They came back to honour Kea's memory. He and Goodness decided to go back to Port alfred with their daughter.  He came back in season 7 to get vengeance for Bhambatha, Mlungisi and Nkosiyabo (Main role: Season 1 - 5, Recurring role: Season 6 - 7)
 Shaka Khoza, played by Sthembiso Khoza. He is the tough and oldest son of Mzi Khoza. He has a close relationship with his uncle, Brutus. He was married to Mmabatho Mabuza and Linda and is the father of Khaya and Mzi. Diamond planted explosions at his boat wedding that took place in season 2. Shaka was "killed" by Kagiso during a fight with Dingane. He however "resurrected" from the dead. In revenge, he attempted to kill Kagiso and Dingane but Harriet and Brutus restored peace between them. Shaka was in a relationship with Thando Sebata and he had a sexual affair with Onica while being married to Mmabatho. He also was engaged to Goodness Mabuza but caught her cheating on him with his brother Kagiso. He proposed to Thando and she agreed but they mutually ended their relationship. He was in a relationship with Mbali Tau. He left Gauteng and went to Namibia to hide from the police as a fugitive. He later comes back in season 7 to take over his father's business. (Main role: Season 1 - 6, Recurring role: Season 7)
 Lieutenant Vuyiswa "Sis Vee" Maake – Sebata, played by Zandile Msutwana She is introduced as Jerry's partner but later becomes his wife. She is a tough detective who had a brief affair with Jerry's son, Bakang in season 2. She also miscarried in season 2 and had a brief relationship with Zack Phiri. She is the current Police Lieutenant of Tembisa Police Station. Her husband, Jerry was killed by Hector Sebata's men in a failed attempt to kill Harriet and her family. Vuyiswa was arrested in connection with Kea's murder after Jaros planted a box full of evidence that incriminates her in her bedroom. Jaros attempted to kill her but Thato got shot instead of her. Vuyiswa started a relationship with Hector Sebata. They later divorced because Hector was caught cheating with Harriet and she gave birth to their son. It is revealed that Vuyiswa was raped by a man named Derick in season 5. (Main role: Season 1 - 6)
 Kgosi Kgosietsile Mathapelo, played by Sello Maake ka-Ncube. He is the homosexual brother of Harriet and uncle of Kagiso and Kea. He was in a brief relationship with Schumacher and had an affair with married man named Michael. He has a close relationship with his niece, Kea. He has a daughter named Olerato Mathapelo. (Main role: Season 1, Guest role: Season 5 - 6)
 Goodness Mabuza – Khoza, played by Zenande Mfenyana. She is the daughter of the late drug lords Goldfinger and Gracious Mabuza. She came to Johannesburg from Cape Town to avenge her father's death and was in a relationship with Kagiso and Shaka. She is Mmabatho and Martha's cousin and Gift's older sister. She had a brief relationship with Thabiso and got quickly engaged to him. Once realising she doesn't love Thabiso, she dumped him. Feeling angry about Goodness dumping him so quick and sudden, Thabiso got himself drunk and ended up raping Goodness in her bedroom. Goodness then felt so heartbroken after the rape and eventually reported it to the police. No one in court seemed to believe Goodness, up until a recording of the rape was played and Thabiso was soon found guilty. Thabiso managed to escape prison and managed to confront Goodness and Gracious. He then shot Goodness in her shoulder and then attempted to shoot her again and kill her but Goodness's uncle Diamond came and shot Thabiso dead. Diamond, Goodness and Gracious then buried Thabiso's body. Goodness shot and killed Siyanda on the latter's wedding day. She is allegedly pregnant with Kagiso's child. Goodness also had a brief affair with Vuyiswa's boyfriend Bakang. Goodness came back with a daughter (Mvelo) and it was revealed that she is Kagiso's child. The couple subsequently got married and are now living together in the Khoza mansion. She became friends with Thando Sebata. She left with Kagiso and her daughter to start a new life. They came back to honour Kea's memory. They decided to go back to Port alfred with their daughter. She lateron returned to the Khoza residency and told them that her and Kagiso were facing relationship issues.it was later revealed that she had cheated on Kagiso with her personal trainer.(Recurring role: Season 1, Main role: Season 2 - 6, Recurring role: Season 7)
 Gracious Mabuza, played by Rami Chuene. Gracious was the widow of Goldfinger Mabuza. She is also the matriarch of the Mabuza family and a mother to Goodness and Gift. She was in a brief relationship with Dollar and Schumacher and she was killed in the middle of season 4 by Dollar's wife Nomzamo. Gracious was the owner of the Blue Moon Lounge but Goodness took over the reins when she died. (Main role: Season 2 - 4)
 Dr. Mmabatho Mabuza - Khoza, played by Motsoaledi Setumo. She was the wife of Shaka. She is the cousin of Goodness and Gift. She met Shaka in season 2 premiere and got married in the season 2 finale. Once Shaka cheated on Mmabatho with Onica, Mmabatho then ended up cheating on Shaka and had a brief romantic relationship with Madimetja. She then dumped Madimetja after giving birth to her and Shaka's son and revealing that she still loved Shaka and had forgiven him. Then they got a divorce during Shaka's ’funeral’(Recurring role: Season 2, Main role: Season 3 - 4)
 Boitswarelo "Boi" Maake, played by Mara Louw. She is the sister of Jerry and the aunt of Amo, Thato and Bakang. She is also the mother of Kwanele. She was an international singer before opening her own restaurant in Tembisa, Boi's Corner later named The Corner House. Her siblings are Jerry, Roy and Adelaide Maake. (Main role: Season 1 - 2)
 Amogelang "Amo" Maake, played by Natasha Thahane. She is Jerry's daughter and a part owner of The Corner House. She moved to America to work there and was in a relationship with Kagiso. (Main role: Season 1 - 2, Recurring role: season 3 - 4)
 Diamond Mabuza, played by Zolisa Xaluva. He is a dangerous ex con and Gracious' brother in-law. He was also the brother of Goldfinger Mabuza. He killed Brutus' son Bhekumuzi and also kidnapped Vuyiswa. In season 2, Diamond attempted to kill Harriet and Gracious along with their families but instead killed his nephew Gift Mabuza and Roy Maake. He also had relationship with Kamina and got her to spy at the Khoza house whilst dating Kagiso. Once Harriet found out the truth about Kamina, she shot Kamina dead and swore revenge on Diamond. He was later killed by Harriet when she laced poison on his drinking glass in season 3. (Recurring role: Season 2, Main role: Season 3)
 Patronella "Sis Pat" Zulu, played by Thembsie Matu. She is the outspoken and greedy wife of Mjekejeke and the mother of Georgina. She worked as a housekeeper at the Mabuza's. She's currently the housekeeper at Hector's house. She left with her husband to retire and take care of her children in Eastern Cape. (Recurring role: Season 2, Main role: Season 3 - 6, Recurring role: Season 7)
 Dolly, played by Tumi Morake. She is the beautiful, charming, fraudster friend of Harriet and Kgosi. She helped the Khoza family in seasons 2 and 3 when Harriet was in prison. She was in a brief relationship with Brutus. (Recurring role: Season 1 - 3)
Lindiwe Dlamini - Dikana, played by Sindi Dlathu. She is Harriet's friend. She helped Harriet kill diamond. She helped Harriet and her children when she was in jail. (Recurring role: Season 3, Guest role: Season 6)
 Lumko "Schumacher" Toto, played by Vuyolwethu Ngcukana. He is the bisexual driver of Khoza Trucking. He is friends with Mjekejeke, Thato, Georgina and Siyanda. He was in a relationship with Kgosi, Gracious, Prince and Khumbuzile. He also grew interest in Mildred. He also had a romantic relationship with Mpho Sebata but she quickly dumped him after she discovered his affair with another man. She then later forgave and married Schumacher. Schumacher stole R1,7 million rand from Mpho which caused a possible break up in their marriage but when Mpho caught Schumacher with another man in the Sebata mansion, she broke up with him for good and served him with divorce papers. He later disappeared when he was in a relationship with Nomathando. (Recurring role: Season 1 - 2, Main role: Season 3 - 7)
 Thato "TT" Maake, played by Xolani Mayekiso. He is Jerry's nephew and Amo's cousin. He was introduced as a drug addict who distributed drugs for Diamond in season 2. He later recovered and he is currently the manager of The Corner House. His mother is Adelaide Maake. In season 4, Thato unknowingly started sleeping with mother and daughter Mildred and Warona Sefatsa. He is friends with Schumacher, Mjekekeke, Georgina and Siyanda. During a driver swap with Sis Vee, Jaros shot at their car and Thato was shot instead of Vuyiswa. Thato's estranged father, Jackal Mkhondo came back into his life in season 5. Much to his dismay, Sis Vee gave him a place to stay in their house. Thato was killed by Hector and Thando after he realised that Hector was responsible for Jerry's death.(Recurring role: Season 2, Main role: Season 3 - 5)
 Dingane Khoza, played by Nay Maps. He is Brutus' son and Kea, Kagiso and Shaka's cousin. He is an ex-con. He was involved in Shaka's death. (Main role: Season 4)
 Jabulani "Mjekejeke" Zulu, played by Sipho Manzini. He is a mechanic at Khoza Trucking. He is also the calm and collected husband of Patronella and Georgina's father. He is friends with Schumacher and Thato. (Recurring role: Season 1 - 2, Main role: Season 3 - 7)
 Ntombizodwa "Zodwa" Khoza, played by Brenda Mhlongo. Zodwa is Mzi's ex-wife and Shaka's mother.She is the one who got Shaka and brutus out of jail. She's always been at loggerheads with Harriet, Kea and Kagiso. During season 4, she tried killing Harriet but instead poisoned the whole family. Brutus opted to not tell Harriet and told her to go back to KZN. (Guest role: Season 3, Main role: Season 4)
 Detectivr Georgina "Gigi" Zulu, played by Sibusiswe Jili. She is Patronella and Mjekejeke's daughter. She is a cop at Tembisa Police Station and she is friends with Siyanda, Schumacher and Thato. She is Vuyiswa's confidant and was helping her investigate Jaros. She was promoted as detective. She later had a relationship with Shumacher. (Main role: Season 4 - 6)
 Siyanda Dlamini, played by Cindy Mahlangu. She was introduced as a soccer players Thabiso's fiancé and mother of his daughter in season 3. She works at The Corner House as a waitress after her fiancé is killed. She was in a relationship with Kagiso. She is a recovering drug addict after she got access to the Khoza merchandise. She was pregnant with Kagiso's child but later had a miscarriage after finding out Goodness was also pregnant with Kagiso's child. Siyanda was later "shot dead" by Goodness on her wedding day. However it was later revealed that Siyanda survived being shot and got her job back working at the Corner House. It is revealed the reason why Goodness attempted to kill Siyanda was because Siyanda held Goodness hostage. (Recurring role: Season 3, Main role: Season 4 - 6)
 Mildred Sefatsa, played by Kuli Roberts. Mildred is Vuyiswa's friend from the police academy but she quit and married a businessman. She is Warona's mother. She has an interest in young men and she recently fell for Thato. (Recurring role: Season 4)
 Warona Sefatsa, played by Rosemary Zimu. Warona is Mildred's daughter. She also fell for Thato and they were in a relationship, until she found out that he was sleeping with her and her mother. (Recurring role: Season 4)
 Colonel Hector Sebata, played by Rapulana Seiphemo. Hector Sebata is the newest police colonel in Tembisa and leads a double life. On one side he is a police colonel but on the other side he is a drug lord who wants to take over Gauteng. He wants to be the biggest drug lord in Africa and he can't do that with Harriet on the throne and the Khoza's reigning over the territory. Knowing very well that he was behind the attack, Hector visited a distraught Vuyiswa and Thato and "promised" that he will do all that he can to find the thugs that killed Jerry. His daughters are Thando and Mpho Sebata and his sidekick is Jaros. He was in a relationship with Harriet. He was later killed by Harriet. (Guest role: Season 4, Main role: Season 5 - 6)
 Detective Jaros Motale, played by Kenneth Nkosi. Jaros is Hector's sidekick. He is the one carrying all the plans out to kill the Khoza's while Hector is the brains behind it. He planted a bomb in one of the Khoza's cars hoping that it would kill Harriet but it killed Kea instead. Vuyiswa figured out that Jaros was connected to Mickey, one of the shooters at the golf course and told Hector about it. Hector ordered Jaros to kill Vuyiswa. During a driver swap with Thato, Jaros shot at their car and shot Thato instead of Vuyiswa. Jaros was killed by Thando because he was going to snitch on Hector to Vuyiswa. (Guest role: Season 4, Recurring role: Season 5)
 Thando Sebata, played by Jessica Nkosi Thando is Hector's oldest child and Mpho's sister. She is a trained sniper and assassin she is a very dangerous and ruthless drug lord and she is in charge of the Sebata cocaine business. She is the heiress to the Sebata business. She killed Jaros and took over the Khoza's cocaine territory and becomes Harriet's rival as well as the new Queen of drug trafficking. She was Shaka's love interest, Shaka proposed to Thando and she accepted. But they broke up because their family didn't get along well. She was killed by Cebo'lihle (brutus's son) For killing MaJali. (Main role: Season 5 - 6)
 Mpho Sebata, played by Ntando Duma. She is Hector's youngest daughter and Thando's younger sister. It was revealed that their mother died a few years ago. She is an heiress to the Sebata business. She doesn't know about the drug business. Mpho has a romantic relationship with Schumacher but quickly dumps after catching him having sex with another man. She later forgives him and marries Schumacher. Schumacher stole R1,7 million rand from Mpho which caused a possible break up in their marriage but when Mpho caught Schumacher with another man in the Sebata mansion, she broke up with him for good and served him with divorce papers. Mpho was shot and killed by the Khoza's at Hector's 50th birthday. (Main role: Season 5)
 NomaPrincess "Noma" Matshikiza, played by Brenda Ngxoli. Noma is Harriet's friend from the past who borrowed R10 million to bid for a tender to build stadiums. She recently came back and went undercover to pose as a buyer from Thando. She was in a romantic relationship with Brutus. She was also the new owner of Blue Moon Lounge. (Main role: Season 5 - 6)
 Olerato Mathapelo, played by Lorraine Moropa. She is Kgosi's daughter and Harriet's niece. Her mother died years ago. She is Kea and Kagiso's cousin. She was in a relationship with Khumo. She was killed by Londiwe at Bhambatha, Mlungisi and Nkosiyabo's funerals. (Recurring role: Season 5, Main role: Season 6 - 7)
 Londiwe Jama, played by Sthandile Nkosi. She is the New Season 7 queen, she is a ruthless killer. She wants to take over as the cocaine Queen in Gauteng, she wants to dethrone Harriet as The Queen. She killed all the Members of the Big 5 to start a new, younger more powerful Big 5, she worked with the Khoza's until she betrayed them. When Bhambatha and Mlungisi found out she killed them, then she went to hide in a restaurant, later the Khoza's found her and she killed Her brother Duma and Nkosiyabo. She works with Shaka to Kill and destroy the Khoza's. She was killed by Harriet in the season finale. (Main role: Season 7)

Cast and characters

Cast members
Season 1
Connie Ferguson as Harriet Khoza 
Shona Ferguson as Jerry Maake 
Themba Ndaba as Brutus Khoza 
Loyiso MacDonald as Kagiso Khoza 
Sthembiso Khoza as Shaka Khoza 
Dineo Moeketsi as Kea Khoza 
Sello Maake Ka-Ncube as Kgosi Mathapelo 
Zandile Msutwana as Vuyiswa Jola 
Marah Louw as Boitswarelo Maake
Zenzo Ngqobe as Mogapi Maake 
Natasha Thahane as Amo Maake 
Kabelo Moalusi as Roy Maake 
Season 2
Connie Ferguson as Harriet Khoza 
Shona Ferguson as Jerry Maake 
Rami Chuene as Gracious Mabuza 
Themba Ndaba as Brutus Khoza 
Loyiso Macdonald as Kagiso Khoza 
Sthembiso Khoza as Shaka Khoza 
Dineo Moeketsi as Kea Khoza 
Zandile Msutwana as Vuyiswa Jola 
Zenande Mfenyana as Goodness Mabuza 
Marah Louw as Boitswarelo Maake
Motsoaledi Setumo as Dr. Mabatho Mabuza 
Natasha Thahane as Amo Maake 
Khayakazi Kula as Martha Ndlovu 
Mlamli Mangcala as Sthembiso Radebe 
Thabang Molaba as Gift Mabuza 
Kabelo Moalusi as Roy Maake 
Thato Molamo as Bakang Maake
Thandy Matlaila as Cleo
Season 3
Connie Ferguson as Harriet Khoza 
Shona Ferguson as Jerry Maake 
Rami Chuene as Gracious Mabuza 
Themba Ndaba as Brutus Khoza 
Loyiso Macdonald as Kagiso Khoza 
Sthembiso Khoza as Shaka Khoza 
Dineo Moeketsi as Kea Khoza 
Zandile Msutwana as Vuyiswa Jola - Maake 
Zenande Mfenyana as Goodness Mabuza 
Zolisa Xaluva as Diamond Mabuza 
Motsoaledi Setumo as Mmabatho Khoza
Vuyo Ngcukana as Lumko Shumacher Toto
Sipho Manzini as Jabulani "Mjekejeke" Zulu 
Thembsie Matu as Petronella Zulu 
Xolani Mayekiso as Thato Maake 
Nay Maps as Dingane Khoza 
Mlamli Mangcala as Sthembiso Radebe 
Moshe Ndiki as Prince
Kayakazi Kula as Martha Ndlovu
Season 4
Connie Ferguson as Harriet Khoza 
Shona Ferguson as Jerry Maake 
Rami Chuene as Gracious Mabuza 
Themba Ndaba as Brutus Khoza 
Loyiso Macdonald as Kagiso Khoza 
Sthembiso Khoza as Shaka Khoza 
Dineo Langa as Keabetswe Khoza
Nay Maps Maphalala as Dingane Khoza 
Zandile Msutwana as Vuyiswa Jola - Maake 
Zenande Mfenyana as Goodness Mabuza 
Motsoaledi Setumo as Mmabatho Khoza
Brenda Mhlongo as Ntombizodwa Khoza 
Vuyolwethu Ngcukana as Shumacher Toto
Sipho Manzini as Jabulani "Mjekejeke" Zulu
Thembsie Matu as Petronella Zulu 
Xolani Mayekiso as Thato Maake 
Mlamli Mangcala as Sthembiso Radebe 
Sibusisiwe Jili as Georgina Zulu
Cindy Mahlangu as Siyanda Dlamini
Special Guest crossover:
Sindi Dlathu as Lindiwe Dlamini - Dikana
Season 5
Connie Ferguson as Harriet Khoza 
Rapulana Seiphemo as Hector Sebata 
Themba Ndaba as Brutus Khoza 
Loyiso MacDonald as Kagiso Khoza 
Sthembiso Khoza as Shaka Khoza 
Rapulana Seiphemo as Hector Sebata 
Jessica Nkosi as Thando Sebata 
Zandile Msutwana as Vuyiswa Jola - Sebata 
Zenande Mfenyana as Goodness Mabuza
Vuyolwethu Ngcukana as Schumacher Toto
Sipho Manzini as Jabulani "Mjekejeke" Zulu 
Thembsie Matu as Petronella Zulu 
Brenda Ngxoli NomaPrincess Matshikiza 
Ntando Duma as Mpho Sebata 
Kenneth Nkosi as Detective Jaros Motale
Xolani Mayekiso as Thato Maake 
Sibusisiwe Jili as Georgina Zulu 
Menzi Ngubane as TBA character 
Cindy Mahlangu as Siyanda Dlamini 
Season 6
Connie Ferguson as Harriet Khoza – Sebata
Rapulana Seiphemo as Hector Sebata 
Themba Ndaba as Brutus Khoza 
Sthembiso Khoza as Shaka Khoza
Jessica Nkosi as Thando Sebata 
Zandile Msutwana as Vuyiswa Maake
Zenande Mfenyana as Goodness Mabuza
Vuyolwethu Ngcukana as Schumacher Toto
Sipho Manzini as Jabulani "Mjekejeke" Zulu 
Thembsie Matu as Petronella Zulu 
Brenda Ngxoli as NomaPrincess Matshikiza 
Sibusisiwe Jili as Georgina Zulu
Lorraine Moropa as Olerato Mathapelo
Cindy Mahlangu as Siyanda Dlamini
Khumbuza Meytwa as Bhambatha Khoza
Siphesihle Vazi as Mlungisi Khoza
Ntobeko Mathebula as Cebo'elihle Khoza
Craig Nobela as Nkosiyabo Khoza
Nomsa Buthelezi as Majali Khoza 
Season 7 

Warning: Most of the cast in this show were written off in the final season (S7)
Connie Ferguson as Harriet Khoza 
Themba Ndaba as Brutus Khoza 
Sithandile Nkosi as Londiwe Jama 
Lorraine Moropa as Olerato Mathapelo 
Siphesihle Vazi as Mlungisi Khoza 
Thembsie Matu as Petronella Zulu 
Sipho Manzini as Jabulani "Mjekejeke" Zulu 
Vuyo Ngcukana as Shumacher Toto 
Mbulelo Katise as Duma Jama 
Khumbuza Meytwa as Bhambatha Khoza
Ntobeko Mathebula as Cebo'elihle Khoza
Craig Nobela as Nkosiyabo Khoza

Former cast

Awards and nominations 

Dstv Viewers Choice Awards

|-
| 2017
| "Sello Maake Ka-Ncube"
| Favourite Actor
| 
|-
|2017
|"Themba Ndaba"
|Favourite Actor 
|
|-
|-
| 2018
| "Thembsie Matu"
| rowspan="2"|Favourite Actress
| 
|-
|-
| 2018
| "Rami Chuene"
| 
|-

The South African Film and Television Awards (Saftas)

|-
| 2018
| Joe Assaizky
| Best Achievement In Original Music/Score-TV Soap/Telenovela
| 
|-
|2018
| "Leon kriel"
| Best Achievement in Cinematography-TV Soap/Telenovel
| 
|-
|2018
| "Odette Earle"
| Best Achievement in Art/ Production Design - TV Soap/Telenovela
| 
|-
| 2018
| "Ferguson Films"
| Most Popular TV Soap/Telenovela
| 
|-
| 2020
|"Loyiso MacDonald"
| Best Supporting Actor - Telenovela
| 

The Royalty Soapie Awards

|-
| 2020
| The Queen
| Outstanding Lighting
| 
|-
| 2020
| The Queen
| Outstanding Wardrobe
| 
|-
| 2020
| Sthembiso "Sk" Khoza
| Outstanding Supporting Actor
| 
|-
| 2021
| The Queen
| Outstanding Daily TV Drama
| 
|-
| 2021
| Themba Ndaba
| Outstanding Lead Actor
| 
|-
| 2021
| Jessica Nkosi
| Outstanding Female Villain
| 
|-
| 2021
| The Directing Team
| Outstanding Direction Team
| 
|-
| 2021
| The Queen
| Outstanding Cinematography
| 
|-
| 2021
| The Queen
| Outstanding Editing Team
| 
|-
| 2021
| The Queen
| Outstanding Wardrobe
|

References 

South African television soap operas
Zulu-language television shows
Telenovelas
2016 South African television series debuts